Cochlianthus is a genus of flowering plants in the legume family, Fabaceae. It belongs to the subfamily Faboideae.

Species 
 Cochlianthus gracilis
 Cochlianthus montanus

References

External links 

Phaseoleae
Fabaceae genera